The Autopista AP-8 is a highway (autopista) in the north of Spain and crosses the Basque Country from east to west. It is known as the Autopista del Cantábrico (highway of the Cantabrian) and connects the French border with Bilbao. This toll road passes Donostia-San Sebastián, Zarautz, Eibar and Durango.

At Bilbao the Autopista AP-8 changes into the Autovía A-8, which continues along the Spanish northern coast to Gijón and eventually the region of Galicia.

List of junctions

References 

Roads in the Basque Country (autonomous community)
Autopistas and autovías in Spain